The Actor may refer to:
The Actor (painting) (L'acteur), a 1904 work by Pablo Picasso from his "Pink Period"
 "The Actor" (Flight of the Conchords), a 2007 episode of Flight of the Conchords
"The Actor" (The Moody Blues song), 1968
"The Actor" (Michael Learns to Rock song), 1991
The Actor (1990 film), a 1990 documentary film by John Paskievich
The Actor (1993 film), a 1993 film by Ahmad Pejman
The Actor (upcoming film), an upcoming film by Duke Johnson
Actor

See also
 Actor (disambiguation)